The Argus As 10 was a German-designed and built, air-cooled 90° cylinder bank-angle inverted V8 "low power" aircraft engine, used mainly in training aircraft such as the Arado Ar 66 and Focke-Wulf Fw 56 Stösser  and other small short-range reconnaissance and communications aircraft like the Fieseler Fi 156 Storch during, and shortly after World War II. It was first built in 1928.

Variants
As 10C
As 10C-1
As 10E-2The proposed powerplant of the Pilatus P-1 trainer project.
Salmson 8As-00Postwar production of the Argus As 10 in France
Salmson 8As-04Postwar production of the Argus As 10 in France

Applications

 AGO Ao 192
 Arado Ar 66
 Arado Ar 76
 Dornier Do 12
 Farman F.510 Monitor II
 Fieseler Fi 156 Storch
 Focke-Wulf Fw 56 Stösser
 Focke-Wulf Fw 58
 Gotha Go 145
 Henschel Hs 121
 Kayaba Ka-1 Imperial Japanese Army Observation autogiro
 Klemm Kl 151
 Messerschmitt Bf 108 Taifun
 Rogozarski SIM-XIV-H
 Siebel Si 201

Specifications (Argus As 10 C)

See also

References

Notes

Bibliography

Gunston, Bill. World Encyclopedia of Aero Engines. Cambridge, England. Patrick Stephens Limited, 1989. 
Jane's Fighting Aircraft of World War II. London. Studio Editions Ltd, 1989. 

Aircraft air-cooled V piston engines
1920s aircraft piston engines
AS10
Inverted aircraft piston engines